Palagani Naga Vaishnavi (21 January 2000 – 2 February 2010) was the daughter of Palagani Prabhakara Rao, a noted businessman from Andhra Pradesh, India, and his second wife Narmada.

Disappearance and aftermath
Vaishnavi was kidnapped on 30 January 2010, and murdered by her kidnappers on 2 February. That incident caused tremendous shock for her father, resulting in cardiac arrest and death. She had previously been kidnapped in 2005. Her murder caused widespread outrage throughout Andhra Pradesh.

Her older brother, Sai Tejesh, escaped from the truck when Vaishnavi was kidnapped. Her father had sought justice for his daughter's murder, and has now died due to a heart attack.

A Vijayawada Women Sessions Court in June 2018 sentenced the three accused kidnappers to life imprisonment.

Both of Naga's parents died before the accused were sentenced.

See also 
List of kidnappings
List of solved missing person cases

References

External links
Breakthrough in Vaishnavi murder
Greed love and grief
Vaishnavi Death

2000 births
2010 deaths
2010s missing person cases
Female murder victims
Formerly missing people
Incidents of violence against girls
Incidents of violence against women
Kidnapped Indian children
Kidnapped Indian people
Missing person cases in India
Murdered Indian children
People from Vijayawada
People murdered in Andhra Pradesh
Violence against women in India